The Great Ace Attorney 2: Resolve is an adventure game in the Ace Attorney series and the sequel to The Great Ace Attorney: Adventures, developed and published by Capcom. It was directed by Shu Takumi and produced by Motohide Eshiro. The game was released for the Nintendo 3DS in Japan in August 2017, with Android and iOS versions following in April 2018. Resolve was released worldwide in July 2021 via The Great Ace Attorney Chronicles, a compilation of both games for Nintendo Switch, PlayStation 4, and Windows.

The game won the Famitsu Awards  2017 in the Excellency category.

Gameplay

The game focuses on the signature courtroom style of gameplay used in the Ace Attorney series, including the fully 3D environments and character models that became a part of the franchise since Phoenix Wright: Ace Attorney – Dual Destinies. Like its predecessor, most of the game's episodes are divided between two phases: investigation, in which players explore areas to gather evidence and testimonies; and courtroom battles, in which players must use evidence to find contradictions in witness testimonies to find the truth behind a case. In the latter phase, the player will sometimes have to cross-examine multiple witnesses at the same time, potentially gleaning new information by addressing one witness when they react to another's statement.

The game retains two additional gameplay mechanics introduced in The Great Ace Attorney: Adventures: the Dance of Deduction, and Summation Examinations. Dance of Deduction segments occur during certain investigations and involve correcting mistakes with a flawed theory on a crime issued by the character Herlock Sholmes, based on his observations of the scene and the behavior of witnesses. In these, players must correct his mistakes to reach a more logical conclusion, by examining the scene and witnesses carefully while comparing what is seen to what he states in his theory. Summation Examinations take place during trials, and focus upon convincing the jury to postpone declaring a guilty verdict in order to let the trial continue. Players accomplish this by comparing statements from two different jurors that contradict or otherwise prove strongly relevant to each other, and sometimes may be required to press a juror or present evidence in order to change their statement.

Plot
Four months after the events of Adventures, Susato Mikotoba returns to Japan only to find her best friend accused of murdering Jezaille Brett, the murderer of John Wilson. Aided by her father Yujin, Susato disguises herself as the male cousin of her friend Ryunosuke Naruhodo and proves her friend's innocence. After the trial, she finds that her return home was due to a case she and Ryunosuke handled in England six months ago. In that case, after proving the defendant innocent in the near-fatal poisoning of a failed actor, the pair discovered a jeweled dog collar in the defendant's apartment, but were forced by detective Herlock Sholmes to hand it over to the police, advising them and his assistant Iris Wilson to not disclose any details of their discovery.

In England, an explosion at the demonstration of an experimental teleportation device results in its inventor being held responsible for the death of a known crime lord. Ryunosuke, upon receiving permission from Lord Chief Justice Mael Stronghart to return to court (following an investigation of his first trial in the country), is assigned to defend them. Facing off against the infamous Barok van Zieks — a prosecutor who is known as the "Reaper" due to how everyone he prosecutes is either found guilty or dies under mysterious circumstances - who in turn is accompanied by the mute Masked Apprentice, an amnesic man Stronghart assigned to van Zieks. Throughout the trial, Ryunosuke discovers that the case is linked to a decade-old case in which five members of the aristocracy were killed by an individual known as the "Professor" using an enormous hound, with the fifth victim being van Zieks's brother Klint. Moreover, it is revealed that the Professor escaped his own execution in a closed casket, only to be shot rising from his grave. With the aid of Susato upon her return to England, Ryunosuke proves the victim was murdered by Scotland Yard's chief coroner, Courtney Sithe, who was being blackmailed over her part in the Professor's escape. Afterwards, van Zieks unveils the Professor to be a Japanese man named Genshin Asogi, the father to Kazuma Asogi, Ryunosuke's close friend. This brings back all of the Masked Apprentice's memories, revealed to be Kazuma himself, having actually survived the events of Adventures and made his way to London. 

Several days later, Inspector Tobias Gregson is murdered while investigating the Red-Headed League. Despite their previous animosity, Ryunosuke comes to van Zieks' defense when he is arrested as the prime suspect. However, he is surprised to learn that he will be facing off against Kazuma as the prosecution. Due to the nature of the case, the trial is to be closed to the public, resulting in no jury being present. As the trial commences, Ryunosuke discovers that Kazuma came to England to uncover the truth of his father, and he blames van Zieks for sending Genshin to the gallows as the supposed Professor. After a witness collapses from recalling the repressed memory of Genshin's escape, the trial is suspended to allow for further investigation into the matter. 

As the trial resumes, Stronghart takes over as the judge. With the help of Yujin Mikotoba - revealed to be Sholmes' partner and not Wilson, as Iris had assumed - Sholmes' investigations leads him to uncover that there was an assassin exchange arranged between Britain and Japan to each send an assassin over as exchange students (Jezaille Brett and Kazuma Asogi) to kill targets in each country (John H. Wilson and Tobias Gregson), so to be protected by diplomatic immunity and eliminate anyone who may know the truth of the Professor case. Moreover, he discovers that the visiting Japanese Minister of Foreign Affairs, Seishiro Jigoku, is the mastermind of this exchange in Japan, and when Kazuma refused his end of the bargain, he murdered Gregson himself. Ryunosuke further uncovers that Stronghart is the true mastermind behind the exchange and the Reaper murders as well, having used the likes of Brett, Gregson, Wilson, Sithe and Jigoku as accomplices. Furthermore, Klint is revealed to have been the actual Professor, disillusioned by the corruption in the aristocracy, and did in fact set his hound upon the first of the victims. However, Stronghart found out and blackmailed him into every murder afterwards, effectively masterminding the Professor murders as well. His plans soon began to come undone when Genshin discovered what was happening and put a stop to it by mercifully killing Klint in a duel. Afterwards, Genshin was able to barter for his life using a confession that Klint had written shortly before his death that would expose Stronghart, but was later murdered by Jigoku when his fake execution was accidentally uncovered by mistake. However, the confession was never found until Ryunosuke finds it from within Genshin's katana during the trial.

Despite exposing the truth, Stronghart declares he is untouchable, having never actually personally killed anyone himself. At that moment, Sholmes holographically appears before court, having shown the Queen all of the proceedings, including all of the crimes that Stronghart had committed, to which she summarily strips him of his position and has him arrested to be tried in a public trial. With the case finally over, Sholmes and Yujin reveal to Ryunosuke that Iris is actually the daughter of Klint, not Wilson, and that Klint had entrusted her to Genshin before his death, who in turn entrusted her to Yujin before his execution. However, Yujin couldn't take her back with him to Japan, so Sholmes raised her for the past decade. They both sought to conceal her true parentage from Iris as the truth would have been painful and could brand her as the daughter of a serial killer. After making peace with both van Zieks and Kazuma, who decides to remain behind as a prosecutor, Ryunosuke returns to Japan with Susato to aid in the growth of its fledgling judicial system.

Reception
For the 3DS, the download version of Dai Gyakuten Saiban: Naruhodō Ryūnosuke no Kakugo was #12 on the most downloaded games from the Nintendo eShop in 2020, years after the 2017 release but when new 3DS games had largely stopped being released.

Notes

References

External links

2017 video games
Ace Attorney video games
Adventure games
Android (operating system) games
Capcom games
IOS games
Meiji period in fiction
Nintendo 3DS eShop games
Nintendo 3DS games
Nintendo Switch games
PlayStation 4 games
Steampunk video games
Victorian era in popular culture
Video games based on Sherlock Holmes
Video games developed in Japan
Video games directed by Shu Takumi
Video games set in England
Visual novels
Windows games
Video games set in the British Empire
Video games set in the 19th century
Single-player video games